Washington Township is one of twelve townships in Chickasaw County, Iowa, USA.  As of the 2000 census, its population was 954.

Geography
According to the USGS, it contains four cemeteries: Calvary, Eggleston Farm, Saint Marys and Union.

Transportation
Washington Township contains one airport or landing strip, New Hampton Municipal Airport.

References
 USGS Geographic Names Information System (GNIS)

External links
 US-Counties.com
 City-Data.com

Townships in Chickasaw County, Iowa
Townships in Iowa